The trifluoromethyl cation is a molecular cation with a formula of . It is a carbocation due to its positively charged carbon atom. It is part of the family of carbenium ions, with three fluorine atoms as substituents in place of its hydrogen atoms.

Stability 
Compared to methenium (the simplest carbenium ion), trifluoromethyl cation is more stable due to the presence of fluorine atoms. The fluorine atoms have lone pairs of electrons overlapping with the carbon atom. These electrons stabilize the positive charge of the central carbon atom, stabilizing the molecule as a whole. The overlap is effective due to the size of fluorine's p orbital in the molecule.

Synthesis 
While electron-donating fluorine lone pairs are present, it does not exist as its own. The production of a  cation has been described as "extremely hard".  The first relevant reagent, a diaryl(trifluoromethyl) sulfonium salt was developed in 1984 by reaction of an aryltrifluoromethyl sulfoxide 1 with  followed by reaction with an electron-rich arene. Now the reaction of the source of the cation usually uses 5-(trifluoromethyl)dibenzothiophenium tetrafluoroborate as the reagent.

References 

Cations